is a stratovolcano on the border of Nagano and Niigata prefectures in central Honshū, Japan. It was active between 200,000 and 800,000 years ago. It is primarily made of andesite.

See also
 List of volcanoes in Japan
 List of mountains in Japan

References

External links 
 
 
 Naeba San - Geological Survey of Japan

Mountains of Nagano Prefecture
Mountains of Niigata Prefecture
Stratovolcanoes of Japan
Volcanoes of Nagano Prefecture
Volcanoes of Niigata Prefecture
Pleistocene stratovolcanoes
Volcanoes of Honshū